Afroarctia sjostedti is a moth of the family Erebidae. It was described by Per Olof Christopher Aurivillius in 1899 and is found in Ivory Coast, Nigeria and Cameroon.

References

Moths described in 1899
Erebid moths of Africa
Spilosomina